Bradley Edwards may refer to:

 Bradley C. Edwards, physicist
 Bradley Robert Edwards (born 1968), convicted murderer in the 1996–1997 Claremont serial killings
 Bradley Edwards, attorney and representative of multiple victims of convicted sex offender Jeffrey Epstein